The Philippine Congressional Medal was a service medal of the United States Army which was established by the United States Congress on 9 July 1906.  The medal recognized those soldiers who had enlisted in the United States Army for the purpose of the serving in the Philippine–American War.

Criteria
The four primary criteria, to be awarded the Philippine Congressional Medal, were as follows:
 Enlisted between 21 April and 26 October 1898
 Served beyond 11 April 1899
 Served in the Philippines after 6 July 1899
 Received an honorable discharge (or died prior to being discharged)

The medal was different from the Philippine Campaign Medal in that the Philippine Campaign Medal recognized general service in the Philippines while the Philippine Congressional Medal was intended for special services rendered.

The Philippine Congressional Medal was considered an authorized military decoration, but soon became regarded as a commemorative medal since it recognized a single event and also was not eligible for presentation to the United States Navy and Marine Corps.

Appearance
The Philippine Congressional Medal is 1 1/4 inches in diameter made of bronze with an oxidized and relieved finish. The obverse of the medal depicts a color guard of one flag bearer accompanied by two soldiers bearing rifles, marching toward the left of the medal. Around the edge of the medal are the words PHILIPPINE INSURRECTION. In the exergue is the date 1899. The reverse bears the inscription FOR PATRIOTISM FORTITUDE AND LOYALTY surrounded by a wreath of pine branches on the left and palms on the right, tied at the bottom with a bow. The suspension and service ribbons are ultramarine blue with edge stripes of red and white. The outside white stripes are 1/16 of an inch from the edge and 1/16 inches wide. The inside stripes of old glory red and white are 1/8 inches wide.

See also
 Awards and decorations of the United States military

References

External links

 US Army Institute of Heraldry: Philippine Congressional Medal

Military history of the Philippines
United States campaign medals